Geraint Wyn Davies (20 April 1957) is a British-American stage, film and television actor-director. Educated in Canada, he has worked in the United Kingdom, Canada and the United States. His most famous role as the vampire-turned police detective Nick Knight in the Canadian television series Forever Knight.

Early life and training
Geraint Wyn Davies was born on 20 April 1957 in Swansea, Wales, the son of a Congregationalist Christian preacher and a school teacher. At the age of 7 he moved with his family from Haverfordwest, Pembrokeshire to Canada, where he attended Upper Canada College. He first acted at age 12, appearing in a school production of Lord of the Flies. He went on to study at the University of Western Ontario, where he studied economics before dropping out to pursue an acting career. 

His professional stage debut was in 1976 in Quebec City, when at 19 he appeared in The Fantasticks, Red Emma, and A Midsummer Night's Dream.

Stage career

Davies moved from Quebec to London's Centre Stage theatre company, and later played the lead in The Last Englishman with the British Actors Theatre Company. He spent two seasons with Theatr Clwyd, touring Britain in Enemy of the People and Hamlet (for which he received the Regional Theatre Best Actor award), and a season with the Chichester Festival, in Henry VIII. In Canada, he appeared over several seasons with the Shaw Festival and Stratford Festival of Canada. He gained a reputation for his performances in The Music Cure, Candida, Cyrano de Bergereac, The Vortex, Goodnight Disgrace, Henry V, and The Three Musketeers. He sang his way through the Rodgers and Hart musical The Boys from Syracuse.

Other performances include My Fat Friend in Los Angeles and Sleuth with Patrick Macnee in Toronto. In 2004, he appeared in Washington, D.C. in the title roles of Cyrano de Bergerac .

In April 1996, Davies appeared as Petruchio in Shakespeare's The Taming of The Shrew, directed by Patrick Tucker of the Original Shakespeare Company. This three-performance run was presented as Shakespeare's own players may have done—with sparse rehearsal, eclectic costuming, and rotating roles. In Spring 1998, he appeared in the Moises Kaufmann production Gross Indecency: The Three Trials of Oscar Wilde at the Mark Taper Forum in Los Angeles. Gross Indecency earned the Garland Award for "Best Ensemble Cast from Backstage West" that year.

In August 1999, Davies starred in Leon Pownall's one-man show An Evening with Dylan Thomas at the Atlantic Theatre Festival in Nova Scotia, Canada. The following summer he returned to the Atlantic Theatre Festival in Pownall's Dylan Thomas and Shakespeare: In the Envy of Some Greatness. August 2001 saw the completion of Pownall's Dylan Thomas trilogy with Stranger in Paradise. In mid-2002, he returned to the Stratford Festival Theatre's main stage in My Fair Lady, as Henry Higgins, a role he alternated with Colm Feore. He reprised the role of Dylan Thomas at the Festival's Studio Theatre, and returned to the Atlantic Theatre Festival in August 2003 to perform Hughie (a one-act play by Eugene O'Neill). The evening was topped off by a presentation of The Sermon by David Mamet.

2004 saw Davies appear at the Lincoln in New York as Edmund to Christopher Plummer's King Lear.

In the summer of 2004, he starred in the title role of Cyrano in Barry Kornhauser's adaptation of Cyrano de Bergerac at The Shakespeare Theatre in Washington, D.C., for which he won the Helen Hayes Award for Outstanding Lead Actor in a Resident Play.

The next year, in 2005, he was Dylan Thomas for seven weeks in Do Not Go Gentle at the Arclight Theatre in New York City. While there, he did a reading of Tennessee Williams's letters at the New York Public Library, and performed in a reading of Eugene O'Neill's Days Without End. In September 2005, he joined in a reading of R. L. Stevenson's Treasure Island in Washington, D.C., and in October, took part in a staged reading of a new play by Austin Pendleton entitled H6R3, which blends Shakespeare's plays Henry VI and Richard III.

In 2006, he returned to The Shakespeare Theatre in Washington, D.C. to perform Don Armado in Michael Kahn's 1960s version of Shakespeare's Love's Labor's Lost. Following the American run, the play moved to the Royal Shakespeare Company at Stratford-Upon-Avon in the UK for a limited run. He was nominated but did not win The Helen Hayes Award for Outstanding Supporting Actor, Resident Play for Don Armado.

While in D.C., he participated in a reading of London Assurance by Dion Boucicault.

Early in 2007, Davies headlined as Richard III by Shakespeare at The Shakespeare Theatre in Washington, D.C. He, along with friend Brent Carver, opened Toronto's CanStage production of The Elephant Man in mid-October. In 2008, he returned to Ontario's Stratford Festival to appear in Hamlet (as Polonius) and Fuente Ovejuna (as the King). He followed the Stratford season playing the Duke at the Red Bull Theater (NYC) production of Women Beware Women. He returned to Stratford in 2009, playing Duncan in Macbeth, Caesar in Julius Caesar and Bottom in A Midsummer Night’s Dream. For the 2010 Stratford Festival season, he portrayed King Arthur in Camelot and Falstaff in Merry Wives of Windsor. The 2011 season featured him again in a singing role as King Arthur.

For the Stratford Festival's 60th season in 2013, Davies portrayed Duke Vincentio in Measure for Measure and the Earl of Leicester in Mary Stuart. The following year, he continued at the Stratford Festival, portraying Antony in Antony & Cleopatra and the Cook in Mother Courage. For the 2015 season, he portrayed Claudius in Hamlet, and Johann Wilhelm Mobius in The Physicists.

He played Prospero in The Tempest in the 2014-2015 season of The Shakespeare Theatre of Washington, D.C.

He has voiced two audio books, Great American Suspense: Five Unabridged Classics and Great Classic Hauntings: Six Unabridged Stories.

Filmography
Davies made his film debut in Deadly Harvest in 1977, and has since appeared in many films, among them RoboCop: Prime Directives (2000). In 2007 he appeared in a cameo in Nancy Drew and filmed a made-for-TV movie, Post Mortem for Lifetime.

Deadly Harvest (1977) - Michael Franklin
D.O.A. (1978) - Jon
A Paid Vacation (1979) - Rick Jarrell
The Boys from Syracuse (1986) - Antipholus of Syracuse
Learning to Fly (1986) - Young pilot
Daughters of the Country (1987) - Angus
The Taming of the Shrew (1988) - Hortensio
Bionic Showdown: The Six Million Dollar Man and the Bionic Woman (1989) - Allan Devlin
 (1992) - Anton/Tony
Hush Little Baby (1993) - Dr. Martin Nolan
Other Women's Children (1993) - Matt Stewart
Ghost Mom (1993) - Martin Mallory
Dancing in the Dark (1995) - Dr. Lambert
The Conspiracy of Fear (1996) - Timothy Straker
Trilogy of Terror II (1996) - Ben
One of the Hollywood Ten (2000) - Michael Wilson
Trudeau (2002) - Premier William G. Davis
American Psycho 2 (2002) - Daniels
Cube 2: Hypercube (2002) - Simon Grady
The Wild Dogs (2002) - Colin
Some Things That Stay (2004) - Mr. Murphy
I Know What I Saw (2007) - Detective Morgan
Pavane (2008) - Phil
 Antony and Cleopatra (2015) — Antony

Television
Davies was a regular in the cast of To Serve and Protect. Since Forever Knight he has appeared in several series. He has guest-starred in episodes of Katts and Dog, Highlander: The Series, Kung Fu: The Legend Continues, The Outer Limits, RoboCop: The Series, Diamonds, Sweating Bullets, 1-800-Missing, among others.

Hangin' In (1982) as Drake/Jonathan (2 episodes)
The Littlest Hobo (1982–83) as Adam Coulter/David Barrington (3 episodes)
The Judge (1986) as Allan Pearson (6 episodes)
Airwolf (1987) as Major Mike Rivers (24 episodes)
Dracula: The Series (1990–91) as Klaus Helsing (5 episodes)
Forever Knight (1992–96) as Det. Nicholas 'Nick' Knight/Nicholas de Brabant (70 episodes)
RoboCop (Canadian TV series) (1994) as Martin (episode: "Provision 22")
Black Harbour (1996–99) as Nick Haskell (34 episodes)
The Outer Limits (1996–2001) as David / Sheriff Grady Markham (2 episodes)
Robocop: Prime Directives (2001) (TV Mini-Series) as Dr. David Kaydick (episode 1 - "Dark Justice")
Robocop: Prime Directives (2001) (TV Mini-Series) as Dr. David Kaydick (episode 2 - "Meltdown")
Robocop: Prime Directives (2001) (TV Mini-Series) as Dr. David Kaydick (episode 3 - "Resurrection")
Robocop: Prime Directives (2001) (TV Mini-Series) as Dr. David Kaydick (episode 4 - "Crash and Burn")
Tracker (2001–2002) as Zin (12 episodes)
Slings and Arrows (2005) as Henry Breedlove (5 episodes)
24 (2006) as James Nathanson (6 episodes)
ReGenesis (2007–2008) as Carleton Riddlemeyer (18 episodes)
Murdoch Mysteries (2008 & 2013) as Sir Arthur Conan Doyle (3 episodes)
Frankie Drake Mysteries (2021) as Ned Drake (one episode)

Directing
Davies has directed several episodes of Forever Knight, Black Harbour, Pit Pony, Power Play and North of 60.

Music

In Forever Knight, Wyn Davies played the piano in the loft and co-wrote a song for the "Baby Baby" episode; he was featured in one of the selections on the first Forever Knight CD. He has appeared in several musicals, notably as Henry Higgins in My Fair Lady in Stratford, Ontario.

Wyn Davies produced a CD of his own works, Bar Talk, which is sold through his fan club with the proceeds going to a variety of charities such as Alex's Lemonade Stand Foundation, Children's Hospital Foundation in Washington D.C., the Atlantic Theatre Festival of Wolfville and The Stratford Festival's Shakespeare School (Stratford, Ontario).

Personal life
Wyn Davies was married to Canadian artist Alana Guinn from 1985 to 2006. They have two children, daughter Pyper and son Galen.

On 13 June 2006, Wyn Davies became an American citizen, having been sworn in by Supreme Court Justice Ruth Bader Ginsburg. 

In August 2011, he married actress Claire Lautier.

References

External links

1957 births
Living people
American male film actors
American male stage actors
American male television actors
American people of Welsh descent
Canadian male film actors
Canadian male stage actors
Canadian male television actors
Welsh emigrants to Canada
People from Haverfordwest
Male actors from Swansea
Upper Canada College alumni
Canadian expatriate male actors in the United States
Canadian male Shakespearean actors
20th-century Canadian male actors
21st-century Canadian male actors